Kukl à Paris 14.9.84 was a live album released by the Icelandic post-punk group Kukl in July 1985, on the independent French record label V.I.S.A. It was only available in cassette format, packaged in a transparent plastic bag with an accompanying 16-page stapled booklet of lyrics, photos and liner notes. The album contained live versions of Kukl's songs as performed at L'Eldorado in Paris, France on 14 September 1984.

Track listing

Side A

Side B

Track notes
Several of the newer songs appeared in studio versions with altered titles on the band's final release, Holidays in Europe (The Naughty Nought) (1986). "He Hapes" became "Gibraltar (Copy Thy Neighbour)", "Carlos" became "France (A Mutual Thrill)", "The Men on the Cross" became "Greece (Just by the Book)", "Vials of Wrath" became "Aegean (Vials of Wrath)" and "Latin" became "Holland (Latent)".

Personnel
 Björk (Björk Guðmundsdóttir) – vocals
 Einar Ørn (Einar Örn Benediktsson)  – vocals 
 God Krist. (Guðlaugur Kristinn Óttarsson) – electric guitar
 Birgir (Birgir Mogensen) – bass guitar
 Melax (Einar Arnaldur Melax) – keyboards
 Tryggur (Sigtryggur Baldursson) – drums

External links
Website about the history and discography of Kukl

Kukl (band) albums
1984 live albums